Thessaloniki B is a constituency of the Hellenic Parliament. It comprises Thessaloniki Prefecture except for the urban area of Thessaloniki, which constitutes Thessaloniki A. It elects nine members of parliament.

Election results

Legislative election
{|class=wikitable
|-
|align="center"|Thessaloniki B constituency results

Members of Parliament

Current members
Dimitris Mardas   	SYRIZA
Sokratis Famellos    SYRIZA
Theodoros Karaoglou   New Democracy
Savvas Anastasiadis  New Democracy
Athanasios Vardalis   Communist Party of Greece
Giorgos Lazaridis  Independent Greeks
Georgios Arvanitidis  PASOK
Aikaterini Markou  The River
Aristeidis Fokas Union of Centrists

Members (Jan 2015- Sep 2015)
Evangelia Ammanatidou-Paschalidou   	SYRIZA
Sokratis Famellos    SYRIZA
Theodoros Karaoglou   New Democracy
Savvas Anastasiadis  New Democracy
Fotios Graikos   Golden Dawn
Stavroula Xoulidou   Independent Greeks
Eleni Gerasimidou  Communist Party of Greece
Aikaterini Markou  The River
Georgios Arvanitidis  PASOK

Notes and references

Parliamentary constituencies of Greece
Thessaloniki (regional unit)